

Edgar Dell (28 November 1901 – 18 April 2008) was a Western Australian painter best known for his watercolour paintings of that state's wildflowers.

Born in England in 1901, he emigrated to Western Australia in 1924, where he bought and cleared a bush block in Paulls Valley in the Shire of Kalamunda, establishing an orchard there. The block came to be known as The Dell; this name has subsequently also been extended to a nearby recreation site. During the Great Depression he made a living cutting timber in the bush, and also painted wildflowers for West Australian Newspapers Ltd., which published one painting a week in a colour supplement to The Western Mail. These were accompanied by a botanical description by Charles Gardner, then Government Botanist, and were so popular that they were compiled into book form and published under the title Western Australian Wildflowers in 1935. A revised and enlarged edition was published in 1958, and again in the 1970s under the title Wildflowers of Western Australia. This ran to numerous editions, albeit with ever-diminishing numbers of Dell's plates.

Little is known of Dell's later life, but as late as 1973 he was still living on the Paulls Valley block that he cleared in the 1930s. He died in 2008, at the age of 106.

See also
 List of Australian botanical illustrators

Notes

References

Publications
 Dell, Edgar (1936). Flowers of Western Australia. Perth, W.A. West Australian Newspapers. 129 leaves of plates. note – cover title: Wild flowers of Western Australia.
 Dell, Edgar (1937). Poison plants of south-western Australia: from water colour drawings description by C.A. Gardner; colour plates by West Australian Newspapers. Perth, W.A.: West Australian Newspapers.

Further reading
 

1901 births
2008 deaths
Australian centenarians
Botanical illustrators
Artists from Perth, Western Australia
20th-century Australian painters
20th-century Australian male artists
Australian male painters
Men centenarians